The 2014 World Junior A Challenge was an international Junior "A" ice hockey tournament organized by Hockey Canada. It was hosted in Kindersley, Saskatchewan, from December 14–20, 2014, at the West Central Events Centre.

Teams
 Canada East (9th Appearance)
 Canada West (9th Appearance, 6th as Hosts)
 Russia (9th Appearance)
 Switzerland (4th Appearance)
 United States (8th Appearance)
 Denmark (1st Appearance)

Background
Canada East, Canada West, Russia, United States and Switzerland all returned, joined this year by a team from Denmark.

Exhibition schedule

2014 Tournament

Preliminary round
All times are local (UTC-6).

Group A

Group B

Playoff round

Quarterfinals

Semi-finals

5th-place game

Bronze-medal game

Gold-medal game

Final standings

Statistics

Awards
Most Valuable Player: Nikolaj Ehlers 

All-Star Team
Forwards: Nikolaj Ehlers , Denis Guryanov , Thomas Novak 
Defense: Callum Fryer  East, Christian Wolanin 
Goalie: Eric Schierhorn

External links
Hockey Canada's WJAC Website

World Junior A Challenge
World Junior A Challenge
World Junior A Challenge
Ice hockey competitions in Saskatchewan